Eua  is an island in the kingdom of Tonga. It is close to Tongatapu, but forms a separate administrative division.

Geography
Eua is a hilly island, the highest peaks are the Teemoa (chicken manure) 312 m, and the Vaiangina (watersprings) 305 m. The island is not volcanic, but was shaped by the rubbing of the Tonga Plate against the Pacific Plate, pushing Eua up and leaving the  Tonga Trench on the bottom of the ocean, a short distance towards the east. The soil of Eua is volcanic, as is that of Tongatapu, but only the top layer, deposited by eruptions of nearby volcanoes ten thousands years ago. Under it are the solid rocks of pushed-up coral. Eua counts many huge caves and holes, not all of which have yet been explored.

Eua and Niuatoputapu are the only islands in Tonga that have streams, and ʿEua had the only bridge in the kingdom until Vavau also built one. The stream drains into the harbour near the capital of the island, Ohonua.

A unique feature is the shore between Ohonua and Tufuvai. It is coral reef still close to the sea level. Many small tidal pools are found, named the otumatafena.

It is served by ʻEua Airport, which has an unsealed coral runway.

Myths
Together with Ata, Eua was the first island to be created by Tangaloa, see Tangaloa And The Story Of How ‘Eua Island Was Created.

History
Eua was put on the European maps by Abel Tasman who reached it and Tongatapu on 21 January 1643. He called it Middelburg Island, after the Dutch city of Middelburg, Zeeland. He did not go on land, but proceeded to the Hihifo district of Tongatapu, which he named Amsterdam Island after the capital of the Netherlands.

'Eua was considered by early Missionaries as heathen as it was the rendezvous for whalers, a place that you can trade goods for guns, knives, axes and gunpowder. aka arsenal, or armory of Tonga, as well as its granary.

Captain James Cook visited the island in 1773 and 1777. On his map, it is named Eaoowe.

Administration
ʻEua is divided into two districts
 'Eua Motu'a (Old 'Eua), in the north, with six villages and population of 2,771.
 'Eua Fo'ou (New 'Eua), in the south, with 2,132 inhabitants in nine villages.

The nine villages of the southern district 'Eua Niuafo'ou (or 'Eua Fo'ou for short) were founded by people who had to leave their island of Niuafo'ou in 1946 due to a volcanic eruption; they are all named after villages of Niuafo'ou.

The northern district in contrast is Old 'Eua. The southern village of Kolomaile's inhabitants however are descendants of the former inhabitants of the island of Ata, Tonga's southernmost island, evacuated after the island was targeted by slavers.

 south-west of the southern tip of 'Eua (Lakufaanga) is the 35-acre island Kalau.

Demography

The villages of the original inhabitants of Eua are all in the north Houma, Taanga, Ohonua, Pangai, Tufuvai.

Haatua and Kolomaile are from the original inhabitants from Ata, who were resettled there in 1863. The villages just north of that up to Angahā, are from the inhabitants of Niuafoou who were resettled there in 1946.

Ecology
ʻEua is the only habitat of the koki (Prosopeia tabuensis) in Tonga. It supports 12 species of birds, nine of lizards, and two bats, the Insular flying fox and Pacific sheath-tailed bat. Bird species include the Buff-banded rail, Pacific imperial pigeon, Crimson-crowned fruit dove, White-rumped swiftlet, Collared kingfisher, Polynesian starling, Polynesian triller and Polynesian wattled honeyeater. Reptiles include the Oceanic gecko, mourning gecko and blue-tailed skink.

Culture

The 2014 film When the Man Went South was mostly filmed on ʻEua.

Gallery

See also 
 'Eua National Park

References

External links
 eua-island-tonga.com (Archived 2009-04-18)

 
History of Tonga
Islands of Tonga
Tongan mythology
Divisions of Tonga